= Yuva Kabaddi Series Summer Edition 2023 =

- Country: India
- Next tournament: Yuva Kabaddi Series Monsoon Edition 2023
- Number of teams: 9
- Current champions: Palani Tuskers
- Most raid points: Durgesh Kumar (274 points)
- Most tackle points: Lokesh Ghosliya (103 points)
- Website: yuvakabaddi.com

Yuva Kabaddi Series Summer Edition 2023 (YKS Summer Edition 2023) was the fifth edition of the tournament, and took place in Karnataka from 17 June to 19 July. 120 matches were held, with Palani Tuskers defeating Periyar Panthers in the final.

== Format ==
Summer Edition 2023 was contested in five rounds, which are Survival Round 1, Survival Round 2, the Booster Round, the Challenger Round, and the Summit Round.

In Survival Round 1, all 9 teams played against each other in a single round-robin format that comprised 36 matches, with the top 3 teams receiving bonus points going into the next round. At the end of Survival Round 2, the last-placed team was eliminated, with the same occurring in the Booster Round and Challenger Round. 6 teams remained in the Summit Round, and 3 Qualifiers and 4 Eliminators were then contested before the final.

All the matches were played at the Chamundi Vihar, Indoor Stadium in Mysore.

The winner of the tournament received ₹20 lakh (US$23,000), while the runner-up received ₹10 lakh (US$12,000).

== Teams ==
The nine teams that competed are Aravalli Arrows, Chambal Challengers, Chola Veerans, Hampi Heroes, Kaziranga Rhinos, Palani Tuskers, Periyar Panthers, Sindh Sonics, and Nilgiri Knights.

== Final ==
The final went into extra time, with Palani Tuskers defeating Periyar Panthers by 2 points.
