= Yuva Kabaddi Series Monsoon Edition 2023 =

- Country: India
- Number of teams: 16
- Current champions: Aravalli Arrows
- Most raid points: Arjun Rathee
- Most tackle points: Sonu Rathee
- Website: yuvakabaddi.com

The CARS24 Yuva Kabaddi Series Monsoon Edition 2023 (YKS Monsoon Edition 2023) is the sixth edition of the tournament, and took place from 24 September to 22 October in Madurai, Tamil Nadu. Aravalli Arrows defeated Murthal Magnets 48-30 in the final.

== Format ==
16 teams will advance through 6 rounds to the final, which are the Challenger Round, Promotion/Relegation Round, Survival Round, Booster Round, and the 8-team Summit Round. The last-placed teams are eliminated at the end of each round. 132 matches will be contested.

Teams will earn five or six points for a win depending on their margin of victory, and a tie gives a team three points. If a team loses by a narrow margin, they earn one point.

The tournament is taking place at Fatima College Indoor Stadium. The winner earned ₹20 lakh (US$24,000), while the runner-up earned ₹10 lakh (US$12,000).

== Teams ==
The teams are Aravalli Arrows, Himalayan Tahrs, Sindh Sonics, Kaziranga Rhinos, Hampi Heroes, Chambal Challengers, Maurya Mavericks, Panchala Pride, Tadoba Tigers, Maratha Marvels, Palani Tuskers, Periyar Panthers, Chola Veerans, Murthal Magnets, Vijayanagara Veers, and Nilgiri Knights.

== Results ==
Teams that made it to the Summit Round: Palani Tuskers, Chola Veerans, and Nilgiri Knights, Aravalli Arrows, Murthal Magnets, Panchala Pride, Vijayanagara Veers, and Hampi Heroes.
